Yellow Creek is a tributary of the Pecatonica River in Stephenson County, in the US state of Illinois. The  stream also flows through a small part of Jo Daviess County. The waters of Yellow Creek were assessed for water quality in 1996, with  being listed as "fair" and  being listed as "good". During the 1832 Black Hawk War, the Battle of Waddams Grove was fought along Yellow Creek.

Course
Yellow Creek is a  tributary within the Pecatonica River watershed and is considered a major stream within that system. Most of its course is through Stephenson County, Illinois, but a small part of the stream flows into Jo Daviess County, in extreme northwestern Illinois.  The stream's source is at 42°25′10″N 89°53′52″W and its mouth is at 42°17′23″N 89°34′10″W.

History

During the 1832 Black Hawk War, a conflict between Sauk Chief Black Hawk's British Band and settlers in Michigan Territory and the state of Illinois, the Battle of Waddams Grove occurred near Yellow Creek. After a number of Native American raids in the area, James W. Stephenson raised a group of volunteers and set out in search of the raiders. The battlefield itself is believed to be located along the Yellow Creek northwest of William Waddams' original land claims north of the present day unincorporated town of Waddams Grove, Illinois.

Water quality
Water quality problems in Yellow Creek stem from nutrient run off as a byproduct of agriculture. In Freeport, Illinois the Yellow Creek Watershed Partnership was established "to improve the health and diversity of Yellow Creek and its watershed".

Notes

Rivers of Illinois
Rivers of Stephenson County, Illinois
Rivers of Jo Daviess County, Illinois
Black Hawk War